Claire Élisabeth Jeanne Gravier de Vergennes de Rémusat (5 January 1780 – 16 December 1821) was a French woman of letters. She married at sixteen, and was attached to the Empress Josephine as dame du palais in 1802.

Life
Talleyrand was among her admirers, and she was generally regarded as a woman of great intellectual capacity and personal grace. After her death, her Essai sur l'éducation des femmes, was published and received academic approval, but it was not until her grandson, Paul de Rémusat, published her Mémoires (3 vols., Paris, 1879–80), which followed by some correspondence with her son (2 vols., 1881), that justice could be done to her literary talent.

Claire's memoirs threw light not only on the Napoleonic court, but also on the youth and education of her son Charles de Rémusat. He developed political views more liberal than those of his parents.

She was the grand-daughter of Jean Gravier, marquis de Vergennes, elder brother of the French Minister of Foreign Affairs and Chief Minister of King Louis XVI, Charles Gravier, comte de Vergennes.

Works

References

External links
 
 
  
 

1780 births
1821 deaths
French memoirists
French women memoirists
French ladies-in-waiting
People of the First French Empire
19th-century women writers
19th-century memoirists